Pterolepis is a genus of flowering plant in the family Melastomataceae. Within Melastomataceae, it forms a clade with genus Pterogastra.  
Pterolepis contains some fifteen species, all of which are found in the Neotropical geographic realmm. Most species are concentrated in Brazil, with a few others across Central and South America.

Species
Species, accepted as of April 2021, are:
Pterolepis alpestris 
Pterolepis buraeavi 
Pterolepis cataphracta 
Pterolepis cearensis 
Pterolepis glomerata 
Pterolepis haplostemona 
Pterolepis parnassiifolia 
Pterolepis perpusilla 
Pterolepis picorondonca 
Pterolepis polygonoides 
Pterolepis repanda 
Pterolepis riedeliana 
Pterolepis rotundifolia 
Pterolepis stenophylla 
Pterolepis trichotoma

References

Melastomataceae
Melastomataceae genera